Shannon Roy Welcome Warren (born 22 November 1988) is a Honduran football player, who currently plays for Chania.

Club career
Welcome started his career at Arsenal in his native Roatán, then played for F.C. Motagua before moving abroad to play on loan for Guatemalan outfit Heredia. He was dismissed by Motagua in December 2011 when he failed to turn up for training sessions. In 2011, he joined Necaxa but was suspended by the club for indiscipline in March 2012. 
In the summer  of 2012, he was loaned to Vida.

In 2013, he left Honduras to play in Greece.

Domestic goals summary

Personal life
He is a cousin of Honduras international striker Georgie Welcome.

References

1988 births
Living people
People from Roatán
Association football forwards
Honduran footballers
F.C. Motagua players
C.D.S. Vida players
Liga Nacional de Fútbol Profesional de Honduras players
Honduran expatriate footballers
Expatriate footballers in Guatemala